Lettonia is a Latvian student fraternity. It is the oldest active Latvian student fraternity.

The fraternity was established in 1870 at Tartu University.

Nowadays, the number of members is about 150 with about 250 members living outside Latvia.

The fraternity's motto is: "vitam, salutem, veritatem".

References

External links

Student organisations in Latvia